Levon Aram Altounian (15 February 1936 – 6 September 2020) was a Lebanese footballer who played as a right winger or an attacking midfielder.

Altounian played his whole club career at Homenetmen, between 1952 and 1973, finishing as top scorer of the Lebanese Premier League twice: in 1962–63 and in 1966–67. Altounian also represented the Lebanon national team, captaining them to a third-place finish at the 1963 Arab Cup.

Club career 
Born on 15 February 1936 in Beirut, Lebanon, Altounian played his whole club career at Homenetmen, between 1952 and 1973. He was awarded top scorer of the Lebanese Premier League twice, during the 1962–63 and 1966–67 seasons, scoring respectively 14 and 19 goals.

International career 
Altounian played for the Lebanon national team, scoring two goals in the 1957 Pan Arab Games and helping Lebanon reach third place. He also participated in the 1963 Arab Cup as Lebanon's captain; he scored six goals, with Lebanon coming in third place in the competition.

Style of play 
Altounian started out as an attacking midfielder, before developing as a right winger. He was known for his speed, dribbling, and technical ability, as well as for scoring difficult top-corner goals.

Personal life 
Levon's favourite player was Mardik Tchaparian in Lebanon, and Pelé worldwide; his favourite coach was Joseph Nalbandian. His brother, Manuel, also played football, and represented Lebanon internationally.

Death 
On 6 September 2020, Altounian died in the Daher El Bachek Hospital in Roumieh, Lebanon.

Career statistics

International

Scores and results list Lebanon's goal tally first, score column indicates score after each Altounian goal.

Honours 
Homenetmen
 Lebanese Premier League: 1954–55, 1962–63, 1968–69
 Lebanese FA Cup: 1961–62

Lebanon
 Pan Arab Games third place: 1957
 Arab Cup third place: 1963

Individual
 Lebanese Premier League top goalscorer: 1962–63, 1966–67

See also
 List of association football families

References

External links

 
 

1936 births
2020 deaths
Footballers from Beirut
Lebanese footballers
Lebanese people of Armenian descent
Ethnic Armenian sportspeople
Association football wingers
Association football midfielders
Homenetmen Beirut footballers
Lebanese Premier League players
Lebanon international footballers
Lebanese Premier League top scorers